Vegan Congress is an activist group, co-founded in 2013 by artists Julie Andreyev, Trudy Chalmers, Beth Carruthers, Jesse Garbe, Carol Gigliotti, Geneviève Raiche-Savoie, and Maria Lantin with the intention to demystify veganism by providing events and information relating to the vegan practice. Currently involving faculty, staff and students at Emily Carr University of Art + Design, Vancouver; Simon Fraser University, Vancouver; University of British Columbia Okanagan, Kelowna; and independent scholar Dr. Carol Gigliotti, working in the US. The Vegan Congress seeks to provide practical knowledge on the global state of non-human animals with respect to ethics, dietary habits, ecology, agriculture and other forms of production and consumption. The effort to address such issues are sought through relational activities and events that aim to encourage discourse concerning one's relationships with other animals, health and the environment, along with striving to promote visibility and applied ethics within a community.

Mission statement
The mission of the Vegan Congress is to provide awareness and compassionate support for non-human animals and to advocate the practice of mindful measures in the service of eliminating the suffering of all subjects-of-a-life. The group attempts to obtain the objective of heightening an awareness of veganism as a form of non-violent defiance, in defence of the right for non-human beings to be treated with commensurate moral value and not as a resource for or property of humans.

Activities
The first event hosted by the Vegan Congress was a cooking demonstration and talk by chef Preet Marawah. It was held January 22, 2014 at the Intersections Digital Studio at Emily Carr University of Art + Design. Preet Marawah is a raw, organic, whole foods chef, CEO and founder of OrganicLives, and formally served as VIP chef at the United Nations.

References

External links
Vegan Congress Official website

Vegan organizations
Environmental organizations based in Canada